Robert Dyas Botten (11 October 1853 – 26 April 1935) was an Australian cricketer. He played one first-class match for South Australia in 1877/88.

See also
 List of South Australian representative cricketers

References

External links
 

1853 births
1935 deaths
Australian cricketers
South Australia cricketers
Cricketers from Greater London